Iwona Hartwich (born 6 September 1970) is a Polish politician. She was an organizer of the 2018 Polish disability protests. She was elected to the Sejm (9th term) representing the constituency of Toruń.

References 

Living people
1970 births
Place of birth missing (living people)
21st-century Polish politicians
21st-century Polish women politicians
Members of the Polish Sejm 2019–2023
Women members of the Sejm of the Republic of Poland